Stadio Arduino Mangoni, is a multi-purpose stadium in Isola del Liri, Italy.  It is mainly used mostly for football matches and hosts the home matches of Isola Liri in Serie D. The stadium has a capacity of 3,120 spectators and meets Lega Pro criteria.

References

External links

Football venues in Italy
Multi-purpose stadiums in Italy